In business and finance, a golden share is a nominal share which is able to outvote all other shares in certain specified circumstances, often held by a government organization, in a government company undergoing the process of privatization and transformation into a stock-company.

Purpose
This share gives the government organization, or other shareholder, the right of decisive vote, thus to vote all other shares, in a shareholder meeting. Usually this will be implemented through clauses in a company's articles of association, and will be designed to prevent stakebuilding above a certain percentage ownership level, or to give a government, or other shareholder, veto powers over any major corporate action, such as the sale of a major asset or subsidiary or of the company as a whole.

In the context of government-owned golden shares, this share is often retained only for some defined period of time to allow a newly privatised company to become accustomed to operating in a public environment, unless ownership of the organisation concerned is deemed to be of ongoing importance to national interests, for example for reasons of national security.

NATS Holdings, the UK's main air navigation service provider, is an example of a company with a golden share.

History
The term arose in the 1980s when the British government retained golden shares in companies it privatised, an approach later taken in many other European countries, as well as the former Soviet Union. It was introduced in Russia by law on November 16, 1992.

In 2013, the People's Republic of China introduced golden shares termed "special management shares." In 2021, The Economist and Reuters described the Chinese government's stake in ByteDance as a golden share investment.

Legal challenges
The British government's golden share in BAA, the UK airports authority, was ruled illegal by European courts in 2003, when it was deemed contradictory to the principle of free circulation of capital within the European Union.  The European Court of Justice also held that Portugal's holding of golden shares in Energias de Portugal is contrary to European Union law since it presented an unjustified restriction on free movement of capital.

Other golden shares ruled illegal include the Spanish government's golden shares in Telefonica, Repsol YPF, Endesa, Argentaria and Tabacalera.

The golden share structure of Volkswagen AG and the travails of the German Land (federal state) of Niedersachsen (Lower Saxony) are discussed by Johannes Adolff as well by as Peer Zumbansen and Daniel Saam.

References 

Corporate finance